Xenelaphis hexagonotus, also known as the Malaysian (or Malayan) brown snake, is a species of snake found across Southeast Asia. The top of its body (the dorsum) is dark brown, with short black bars along its sides of the front part of the body, and it is white on its belly (the ventrum). 

It is diurnal, and its diet includes rats and fish.
It is classified on the IUCN Red List as a species of least concern.

References

Colubrids